Carroll Richard Gibbons (January 4, 1903 – May 10, 1954) was an American-born pianist, bandleader and popular composer who made his career primarily in England during the British dance band era.

Early life and career 
He was born and raised in Clinton, Massachusetts, United States, one of three children of Peter and Mary Gibbons. In his late teens he travelled to London to study at the Royal Academy of Music. In 1924, he returned to London as a relief pianist with the Boston Orchestra for an engagement at the Savoy Hotel in the Strand. 

He liked Britain so much that he settled there, and later became the co-leader (with Howie Jacobs) of the Savoy Orpheans and the bandleader of the New MayFair Orchestra, which recorded for the Gramophone Company on the HMV label. 

In 1929, Gibbons appeared in the British film Splinters as "Carroll Gibbons and His Masters Voice Orchestra". Ray Noble led the New Mayfair [sic] Orchestra starting in 1929.

The 1930s 
Gibbons made occasional return trips to the United States but settled permanently in England, though he did spend a couple of years (1930–1931) in Hollywood, where he worked as a staff composer for MGM films. He took exclusive leadership of the Savoy Hotel Orpheans, which recorded hundreds of popular songs (many of which were sung by Anne Lenner) between June 1932 and his death in 1954, all featuring Gibbons on piano. Starting in about 1931, he also recorded many sophisticated records featuring a piano-led small group playing pop tunes and medleys under the name of Carroll Gibbons and his Boy Friends, of which some contained tracks by singer Hildegarde.

As a composer, Gibbons's most popular songs included "A Garden in the Rain" (1928) and "On the Air" (1932). The latter was covered by Rudy Vallée in 1933 and by Lud Gluskin in 1936. Gibbons' instrumental numbers "Bubbling Over" and "Moonbeam Dance" were also quite successful in the United Kingdom. Gibbons and his orchestra had a weekly show on Radio Luxembourg in the 1930s, sponsored by Hartley's Jam.

Marriage and death 

Gibbons married Joan Muriel (née Lidstone) in 1951. He died at the London Clinic in 1954 at the age of 51, of a coronary thrombosis. He is one of several famous musicians buried in Brookwood Cemetery in Surrey, England.

Legacy 
Specialist dance band radio stations, such as Swing Street Radio and Radio Dismuke, continue to play his records. Gibbons also features regularly on the weekly Manx Radio programme Sweet & Swing, presented by Jim and Howard Caine. The UK 1940s Radio Station, a dedicated Internet radio station, also regularly plays Gibbons's records.

Selected filmography
 Looking on the Bright Side (1932)
 Call Me Mame (1933)
 Romance in Rhythm (1934)
 Falling in Love (1935)
 Hello, Sweetheart (1935)
 Calling All Stars (1937)
 The Common Touch (1941) - accompanies Greta Gynt on piano and vocals
 I Live in Grosvenor Square (1945)

References

External links

 *

 "An Extraordinary Town, How one of America's smallest towns shaped the world" A book on Carroll Gibbon's hometown with an extensive section on the life and contributions of Carroll Gibbons. Written jointly with The Savoy in London.
 

1903 births
1954 deaths
People from Clinton, Massachusetts
Musicians from Massachusetts
American male composers
American bandleaders
British bandleaders
Dance band bandleaders
American expatriates in England
Burials at Brookwood Cemetery
20th-century American composers
20th-century British musicians
20th-century American male musicians